In mathematics, the (field) norm is a particular mapping defined in field theory, which maps elements of a larger field into a subfield.

Formal definition
Let K be a field and L a finite extension (and hence an algebraic extension) of K.

The field L is then a finite dimensional vector space over K.

Multiplication by α, an element of L,

,
is a K-linear transformation of this vector space into itself.

The norm, NL/K(α), is defined as the determinant of this linear transformation.

If L/K is a Galois extension, one may compute the norm of α ∈ L as the product of all the Galois conjugates of α:

where Gal(L/K) denotes the Galois group of L/K. (Note that there may be a repetition in the terms of the product.)

For a general field extension L/K, and nonzero α in L, let σ(α), ..., σ(α) be the roots of the minimal polynomial of α over K  (roots listed with multiplicity and lying in some extension field of L); then
.

If L/K is separable, then each root appears only once in the product (though the exponent, the degree [L:K(α)], may still be greater than 1).

Examples

Quadratic field extensions 
One of the basic examples of norms comes from quadratic field extensions  where  is a square-free integer.

The element  can be represented by the vector

since there is a direct sum decomposition  as a -vector space.

Norm of Q(√2) 

Consider the number field .

The field norm can also be obtained without the Galois group.

.

Then multiplication by the number  sends

So the determinant of "multiplying by " is the determinant of the matrix which sends the vector
viz.:

The determinant of this matrix is −1.

p-th root field extensions 
Another easy class of examples comes from field extensions of the form  where the prime factorization of  contains no -th powers, for  a fixed odd prime.

Complex numbers over the reals 
The field norm from the complex numbers to the real numbers sends

 

to

 ,

 the identity element and
 complex conjugation,
and taking the product yields .

Finite fields 
Let L = GF(qn) be a finite extension of a finite field K = GF(q). 

Since L/K is a Galois extension, if α is in L, then the norm of α is the product of all the Galois conjugates of α, i.e.

 

In this setting we have the additional properties,

Properties of the norm
Several properties of the norm function hold for any finite extension.

Group homomorphism 
The norm N : L* → K* is a group homomorphism from the multiplicative group of L to the multiplicative group of K, that is

Furthermore, if a in K:

If a ∈ K then

Composition with field extensions 
Additionally, the norm behaves well in towers of fields:

if M is a finite extension of L, then the norm from M to K is just the composition of the norm from M to L with the norm from L to K, i.e.

Reduction of the norm 
The norm of an element in an arbitrary field extension can be reduced to an easier computation if the degree of the field extension is already known.

Detection of units 
An element  is a unit if and only if .

For instance

where
.

Then any number field  containing  has it as a unit.

Further properties
The norm of an algebraic integer is again an integer, because it is equal (up to sign) to the constant term of the characteristic polynomial.

In algebraic number theory one defines also norms for ideals. This is done in such a way that if I is a nonzero ideal of OK, the ring of integers of the number field K, N(I) is the number of residue classes in  – i.e. the cardinality of this finite ring. Hence this ideal norm is always a positive integer.

When I is a principal ideal αOK then N(I) is equal to the absolute value of the norm to Q of α, for α an algebraic integer.

See also
 Field trace
 Ideal norm
 Norm form

Notes

References
 
 
 
 

Algebraic number theory